The southern spearnose poacher (Agonopsis sterletus) is a fish in the family Agonidae. It was described by Charles Henry Gilbert in 1898, originally under the genus Averruncus. It is a marine, subtropical fish which is known from the eastern central Pacific Ocean, including California, USA to Baja California, Mexico.

References

Southern spearnose poacher
Taxa named by Charles Henry Gilbert
Fish described in 1898